Jürg Weibel (Bern, 19 August 1944 - Basel, 24 May 2006) was a Swiss writer, journalist and teacher.

He studied medicine, German, history and philology at the University of Basel.  He was a member of Gruppe Olten and of P.E.N.

Career
Jürg Weibel worked as a school teacher and writer, before breaking through as a celebrated writer. He earned fame with his historical novels and plays. Although lesser known as a playwright and poet, he did write them.

Works

Novels
Ellbogenfreiheit. Patriotische Gedichte. Lenos, Basel 1978
Rattenbesuch. Phantastische Erzählungen. Nachtmaschine, Basel 1979
Saat ohne Ernte. Legende und Wirklichkeit im Leben des General Johann August Sutter. Nachtmaschine, Basel 1980
Die schönste Frau der Stadt. 10 Erzählungen. Orte, Zürich 1981
Feinarbeit im Morgengrauen / Laubscher. Zwei Erzählungen. Ritter, Klagenfurt 1981
Das Schweigen der Frauen von Masachapa. Erzählungen. Nachtmaschine, Basel 1983
Geisterstadt. Erzählungen. Nachtmaschine, Basel 1985
Die seltsamen Absenzen des Herrn von Z. Roman. Edition Erpf bei Neptun, Kreuzlingen 1988
Tod in den Kastanien. Roman. Edition Erpf, Bern 1990
Captain Wirz: Eine Chronik. Ein dokumentarischer Roman. Edition Erpf, Bern 1991
Beethovens Fünfte. Roman. Xenon, Basel 1996
Ein Kind von Madonna. Irre Geschichten. Cosmos, Muri bei Bern 1999
Doppelmord am Wisenberg. Kriminalroman. Orte, Oberegg 2006

Short stories
Rats Visit (1979)
Work Fine at Dawn (1981)
The Silence of the women of Masachapa (1983)
Ghost Town (1985)
A Child of Madonna (1999)

Poems
Elbow (1978)

Theatre 
D’Muetter wott’s wüsse. UA: Stadttheater Bern 1985
Tangostunde. UA: Zähringer-Theater Bern 1995

Radio and others 
Die Literatur Lateinamerikas im Aufbruch. Schweizer Radio DRS, 1978
Was hat Jazz mit Literatur zu tun? DRS, 1986/87
Die wunderbare Wirklichkeit Amerikas. Zum Werk Alejo Carpentiers. DRS, 1988
Henry Wirz: Massenmörder oder Sündenbock? (Hörspiel). DRS, 1990
November (Hörspiel). SWF, 1992
Gold-Dreck (Hörspiel in 4 Folgen). SWF, 1994
Schizophrenie und Poesie (Feature). SWR, 2000

External links

References

1944 births
2006 deaths
Swiss writers